"All You Good Good People" is the debut single by English rock band Embrace, on the Fierce Panda label. Only 1,300 copies were made in 1997, but the airplay received by key radio shows was enough to gain significant recognition. An extended play containing the song was released on 27 October 1997, peaking at number eight on the UK Singles Chart that November. The 1,300 originals, mixed by renowned dub and electronica artist Ott, are now collectors' items.

Track listing

EP release

The All You Good Good People EP was released on 27 October 1997 by Hut Records as the first single from the band's debut album, "The Good Will Out" (1998). It became their biggest single to date at the time, and their first to reach the top 10, peaking at number eight.

The video for the US single featured Danny McNamara portraying a death row inmate during the last day before execution. The promo features a shaven-headed McNamara being executed in a replica of Tennessee's electric chair. The songs "The Way I Do", "Free Ride" and "One Big Family (Perfecto Mix)" are featured on the B-sides compilation Dry Kids: B-Sides 1997-2005.

Track listings

Charts

References

1997 debut singles
1997 EPs
1997 songs
Embrace (English band) songs
Fierce Panda Records singles
Hut Records EPs
Songs written by Danny McNamara
Songs written by Richard McNamara
Virgin Records EPs